Orthocomotis parexpansa is a species of moth of the family Tortricidae. It is found in Ecuador in the provinces of Carchi, Morona-Santiago and Pichincha.

The wingspan is 20–28 mm. The ground colour of the forewings is snow white. The suffusions and inner parts of some of the markings are grey and the remaining markings are blackish. The hindwings are brownish grey with some cream spots in the terminal area.

Etymology
The species name refers to the similarity with Orthocomotis expansa, plus the Greek prefix para (meaning near to).

References

Moths described in 2007
Orthocomotis